Cary Koch (born August 28, 1986) is an American former professional football wide receiver. Koch played college football for the University of Virginia after transferring from Tulane University in the aftermath of Hurricane Katrina.

Professional career

Saskatchewan Roughriders
After exhausting his collegiate eligibility, Koch signed with the Saskatchewan Roughriders as a free agent in April, 2010.  He was on the team's practice roster until Prechae Rodriguez was released, clearing a spot for him on the active roster.  Koch made his debut with the Roughriders in week 12 of the season against the Calgary Stampeders.  He caught two passes for 15 yards and was on the receiving end of a successful two-point conversion.

Edmonton Eskimos
Koch signed as a free agent with the Edmonton Eskimos on the first day of free agency on February 15, 2012.

Hamilton Tiger-Cats
Koch signed as a free agent with the Hamilton Tiger-Cats on the first day of free agency on February 11, 2014. He was released by the Tiger Cats on May 1, 2015

Career statistics

References

External links
Hamilton Tiger-Cats bio

The Official Website Of Cary Koch

1986 births
Living people
Edmonton Elks players
Hamilton Tiger-Cats players
Players of American football from Baton Rouge, Louisiana
Saskatchewan Roughriders players
Tulane Green Wave football players
Virginia Cavaliers football players